Sergio Gabriel Ávila Valle, also known as El Gaucho, (born on 2 September 1985) is a Mexican former professional footballer.

Club career

C.D. Guadalajara
He debuted on April 1, 2005, in the Chivas' loss against CF UAG 3–2, but was praised by the then coach Benjamín Galindo. After the loss of 6 players before the FIFA World Cup 2006, Chivas played with a lot of young players, some of them with absolutely no experience in First Division and they managed to reach the semifinals, losing to C.F. Pachuca with a last minute goal.

"El Gauchito" capped his first goal in the Liguilla (Playoffs) of the Clausura 2006 against Chiapas FC. In Apertura 2006, he only played 86 minutes in 3 games. He often played for CD Guadalajara's Lower Division club team CD Tapatío. While Efrain Flores was coach he started every game and contributed to his team's efforts with seven goals.

Sergio Avila's last season with Chivas was the Apertura 2010 season.

Querétaro
In January 2011, it was announced that Ávila, along with Juan Antonio Ocampo, was traded to Querétaro F.C.
Avila only Played 3 games with Querétaro during the Clausura 2011 season and was traded again to La Piedad.

La Piedad
In June 2011, it was announced that Ávila was traded to CF La Piedad. Avila never played a single match and soon retired from Professional Football.

Forced Retirement
Ávila always had leg problems throughout his career, and after many surgeries he was forced to retire at the young age of 25 due to insufficient healing.

International Tournaments with Chivas de Guadalajara
 2007 North American SuperLiga
 2007 Copa Sudamericana
 2008 North American SuperLiga
 2008 Copa Sudamericana
 2008 Copa Libertadores
 2009 Copa Libertadores

International appearances 
Sub-23 International appearances in 2008

International goals 

|-
| 1. || February 19, 2008 || Estadio Nemesio Díez, Toluca, Mexico ||  || 2–0|| 2–0 || Friendly
|-
|}

Honours
Guadalajara
Mexican Primera División: Apertura 2006

External links

1985 births
Living people
People from Irapuato
Footballers from Guanajuato
Association football wingers
Mexican footballers
C.D. Guadalajara footballers
Querétaro F.C. footballers
La Piedad footballers
Liga MX players